The Deficit Reduction Act of 1984, also known as the DEFRA, was a federal law enacted in the United States in 1984. Originally part of the stalled Tax Reform Act of 1983, it was adjusted and reintroduced as the Tax Reform Act of 1984. After passing in the House, it was merged with the Senate version into its final form. Collectively known as the Deficit Reduction Act of 1984, it was signed into law by president Ronald Reagan on July 18, 1984.

Summary of provisions 

The Office of Tax Analysis of the United States Department of the Treasury summarized the tax changes as follows:
 repealed scheduled 15% net interest exclusion ($900 cap)
 reduced benefits from income averaging
 reduced tax benefits for property leased by tax exempt entities
 temporarily extended federal telephone excise tax (through 1987)
 increased depreciation lives for real property from 15 years to 18 years

References

External links
 Full text of the Act

United States federal taxation legislation
1984 in law
Presidency of Ronald Reagan
1984 in economics
98th United States Congress